NGC 4461 (also known as NGC 4443) is a lenticular galaxy located about 50 million light-years away in the constellation of Virgo. It was discovered by astronomer William Herschel on April 12, 1784. NGC 4461 is a member of Markarian's Chain which is part of the Virgo Cluster.

Interaction with NGC 4458
NGC 4461 is in a pair with the nearby galaxy NGC 4458. It has undergone a tidal interaction with NGC 4458.

See also 
 List of NGC objects (4001–5000)
 M86

References

External links 

Lenticular galaxies
Virgo (constellation)
4461
Virgo Cluster
41111
7613
Astronomical objects discovered in 1784